"Love Is on the Way" is a power ballad recorded by American glam metal band Saigon Kick for their second studio album The Lizard, unlike the rest of that album this song is recorded in a straight forward acoustic power ballad way.

The song was written and produced by lead guitarist and backing vocalist Jason Bieler, and is Saigon Kick's only hit on the U.S. Billboard Hot 100 where it peaked at #12. The single was also certified Gold by the RIAA on March 18, 1993.

Track listing

Personnel
Matt Kramer - Lead vocals
Jason Bieler - Lead guitar, backing vocals

Charts and certification

Charts

Certifications

References

External links
Music video

Saigon Kick songs
1992 songs
1992 debut singles
Atlantic Records singles
Rock ballads
American soft rock songs